Dumbarton Middle School is a school located at 300 Dumbarton Road in the Rodgers Forge neighborhood of Towson, Maryland, United States, just outside Baltimore. It is part of the Baltimore County Public Schools system.

Dumbarton currently has more than 1,000 students attending. Students come to Dumbarton from several different elementary schools in Baltimore County, but the majority come from Rodgers Forge Elementary School, located next door to Dumbarton and also a blue ribbon school; Stoneleigh Elementary; Pleasant Plains Elementary; Hampton Elementary; West Towson Elementary; and Riderwood Elementary. Students from Dumbarton go on to Towson High School, another Blue Ribbon School.

Academics
Opened in 1956, the school was awarded the status of Blue Ribbon school in 1998. It offers Spanish, French, and Latin. Dumbarton also has one of the largest ESOL programs in the Baltimore County Public School system, with close to 15% of the school population not having English as a first language. The school has extramural programs/clubs. The school has 44 teachers, 51 classrooms, a cafeteria, library, and gymnasium, with other classes, such as Music, Health, P.E., Art, and Tech.

Notable alumni
 Michael Phelps, most awarded Olympic athlete
 James Morris (bass-baritone), noted bass-baritone opera singer

References

Public middle schools in Maryland
Baltimore County Public Schools
Educational institutions established in 1956
1956 establishments in Maryland